Pedro Sarsfield (died 1837) was a Spanish general of Irish descent who commanded an infantry division during the Peninsular War. He is considered one of the best Spanish tacticians among his generation.

Sarsfield was a descendant of Patrick Sarsfield, a celebrated Jacobite general. He is one of the Spanish generals who were second- or third generation descendants of those came from Ireland after the Battle of Boyne (1690).

He was particularly noted for his involvement in the operations surrounding the Siege of Tortosa in 1810–1811. In a well-conducted action, he defeated two Italian brigades at the Battle of Pla on 15 January 1811. After failing to break the Siege of Figueras, his troops participated in the Siege of Tarragona in May and June 1811. He escaped the disaster, but his division was largely destroyed. Remnants of his division later joined Marques de Campoverde's operation against the French forces led by Louis-Gabriel Suchet, who were occupying the Tarragona fortress.

After the Napoleonic Wars, Sarsfield remained loyal to King Ferdinand VII of Spain. He and Henry O'Donnell, 1st Count of la Bisbal foiled a liberal plot in 1819. That year he was rewarded with promotion to Lieutenant General. But when the liberals took power the next year in the Trienio Liberal, he was banished to the Balearic Islands. He opposed the French intervention to restore Ferdinand, known as the Hundred Thousand Sons of Saint Louis. The 1830s found him leading the liberal army of Navarre during the First Carlist War. He was killed by mutineers at Pamplona in 1837, the same year he led his troops at the Battle of Oriamendi.

References

Spanish soldiers
Spanish generals
Spanish commanders of the Napoleonic Wars
Military personnel of the First Carlist War
Spanish people of Irish descent
1837 deaths
Year of birth missing
Assassinated Spanish people